Mount Bourgeau is a  mountain located in the Massive Range of Banff National Park in Alberta, Canada. It was named by James Hector in 1860 after Eugène Bourgeau, a botanist with the Palliser Expedition. Bourgeau Lake sits at the foot of the mountain and is a popular hiking destination.

Geology

Like other mountains in Banff Park, Mount Bourgeau is composed of sedimentary rock laid down from the Precambrian to Jurassic periods. Formed in shallow seas, this sedimentary rock was pushed east and over the top of younger rock during the Laramide orogeny.

Climate

Based on the Köppen climate classification, Mount Bourgeau is located in a subarctic climate with cold, snowy winters, and mild summers.

References

Two-thousanders of Alberta
Mountains of Banff National Park
Alberta's Rockies